The MacTavish House, on Elm St. in Magdalena, New Mexico, was built in 1915.  It was listed on the National Register of Historic Places in 1982.

It is a two-story woodframe house upon a stone foundation. It reflects Queen Anne style influence, including that it has a turret.

It was built by and/or for J.S. MacTavish (1867-1947), who was born in Scotland, who arrived in Magdalena soon after it was founded, and who was a successful businessman.

References

National Register of Historic Places in Socorro County, New Mexico
Queen Anne architecture in New Mexico
Houses completed in 1915